Supper Moment is a four-member rock band from Hong Kong. They were formed in 2006 and officially debuted in 2010 under Redline Music.

Members 
They consist of lead vocalist and guitarist Sunny, lead guitarist Martin, bass guitarist CK and drummer Hugh (also: Tat).

Origin of band name 
The name originated from the members' attitude towards supper. Supper means dinner. They believe that dinner time is treasurable and precious for Hong Kong people as they are busy and do not have much time to spend with family at home. However, supper should be the warmest moment of the day which many people may neglect of it. As it implies that someone is waiting you at home or waiting to have dinner  after your busy working or studying day etc. Therefore, they want to use their music to let people reflect on their daily life and make their life to be more wonderful.

Discography

Albums

Concerts and mini shows 
 等等... CD Release Show
 旅程 CD Release Show
 Supper Moment @ Live Stage Langham Place
 起動心跳 Live
 再次心跳 Concert (same name as their third album)
 Supper Moment @ Fullcupmusic Cafe
 Supper Moment x Neway Music Live
 小伙子出城記 autograph signing party
 世界變了樣 Concert (same name as their fifth album)
 Redline Music 5th Anniversary Party
 世界變了樣 China tour
 世界變了樣 Home station
 Superjoy Live 2015
 Time Out Hong Kong’s Big Night Out
 HMV x MOOV Supper Moment Alive on Stage
 溫柔革命10th Anniversary Concert  17. Supper Moment London Live 2017    18. Supper Moment 【dal segno】CD release show    19. Supper Moment Live 2018 at Hong Kong Coliseum    20. Supper Moment Live 2019 in Macao and Foshan    21. Supper Moment x Miriam Lam MOOV Live 2019    22. Supper Moment Live 2020 in Vancouvor and Toronto

Chart performance
Supper Moment has topped major charts in Hong Kong many times. 過後 was their first song to achieve number 1, topping the 903 chart in week 1 of 2013. 無盡 repeated the feat in week 38 of 2013, and 世界變了樣 topped the RTHK chart in week 52 of 2013.
By the end of 2017, 大丈夫 was Supper Moment's first song to top all four major charts in Hong Kong.

Awards 

 Year 2008 : Soundbase Festival 2008 Acoustic Band Competition (Gold Prize)
 Year 2009 : A-Space Our Rock Story 5 Band Competition ( Champion, Best Vocal, Best Drummer and Best Original Song Award)
 Year 2010 : 「伊維特樂樂園」"hea爆華山Simple Life"  Original Song Competition ( 1st runner-up)
 Year 2013 : 2013 CASH Golden Sail Music Awards ( Best Performance by a Band (機械人))
 Year 2013 : 2013 Ultimate Song Chart Awards Presentation (Ultimate Group - Silver)
 Year 2014 : 36th Top Ten Chinese Gold Songs Award Concert (Best Improvement Award - Gold)
 Year 2014 : 2014 CASH Golden Sail Music Awards (Best Melody (無盡))
 Year 2014 : 15th Chinese Music Media Award (Cantonese Song (世界變了樣))
 Year 2015 : 2015 CASH Golden Sail Music Awards ( Best Performance by a Band (幸福之歌))
 Year 2015 : 2015 CASH Golden Sail Music Awards (6th Koo Kar Fai New Generation Music Award)
 Year 2015 : 2015 Jade Solid Gold Best Ten Music Awards Presentation (Best Performance Award - Gold)
 Year 2015 : 2015 Jade Solid Gold Best Ten Music Awards Presentation (Best Band - Silver)
 Year 2016 : 2015 Ultimate Song Chart Awards Presentation (Ultimate Top Ten Songs - 10th (幸福之歌))
 Year 2016 : 2015 Ultimate Song Chart Awards Presentation (Ultimate Group - Gold)
 Year 2016 : 2015 Ultimate Song Chart Awards Presentation (Ultimate My Favourite Group)
 Year 2016 : 38th Top Ten Chinese Gold Songs Award Concert (Best band/Group Award - Gold)

References

Cantopop musical groups
Cantonese-language singers